Punjab State Highway 10, commonly referred to as SH 10, is a state highway in the state of Punjab in India. This state highway runs through Patiala district and Sangrur district from Patiala to Moonak in the state of Punjab. The total length of the highway is 75 kilometres.

Route description
The route of the highway is Patiala-Samana-Ghagga-Patran-Moonak

Major junctions

  National Highway 7 in Patiala

See also
List of state highways in Punjab, India

References 

State Highways in Punjab, India